Alessandro Calori (born 29 August 1966) is an Italian football coach and former player, last in charge as head coach of Ternana. As a defender, he is mostly remembered for his lengthy spell with Udinese during the 90s, where he also served as the club's captain.

Playing career
Calori was born in Arezzo. A product of Arezzo's youth system, Calori made his professional debut in 1985 with Serie C team Montevarchi, where he spent four season. After two seasons with Pisa, in 1991 Calori joined Udinese, where he spent eight seasons, all as a regular starter, gaining a reputation as a powerful and physically strong centre back, with good leadership skills, and later also being named the club's captain. In 1999 Calori, then aged 33, signed for Perugia, and gained space in the headlines as he scored the winning goal in a 1–0 win to Juventus in the final league week, a goal that unexpectedly let Juventus lose the Serie A title to Lazio. He retired in 2004, after spells with Brescia and Venezia.

Coaching career
Following his retirement as a player, Calori initially stayed at Venezia, joining the managing staff that worked alongside head coach Julio César Ribas in the arancioneroverdi's 2004–05 season, initially as team manager, and then as assistant coach. In 2005, he became joint coach of Serie B side Triestina, alongside Adriano Buffoni, only to be sacked a few weeks later. In 2006, he was then appointed at the helm of Serie C1 team Sambenedettese, a spell which proved to be unsuccessful as he was sacked in October 2006.

On 10 March 2008, he was unveiled as new Avellino coach, replacing Guido Carboni. He left his post in June, after having failed to save his team from relegation.

In February 2009 he was unveiled as new head coach of Lega Pro Prima Divisione club Portosummaga, replacing Manuele Domenicali. He guided Portosummaga to win the Lega Pro Prima Divisione title in 2009–10, and automatic promotion to Serie B for his club, in a historical first time in the Italian second division for his club. On 2 July 2010, he was unveiled as new head coach of Serie B club Padova. Despite a good first half of season, Calori was dismissed by Padova on 15 March 2011 following a string of negative results.

On 12 December 2011, he was named new head coach of Serie B side Brescia, as a replacement for Giuseppe Scienza.

He served as head coach of Trapani Calcio from 2016 to 2018, witnessing a relegation to Serie C and a failed promotion campaign the following season.

On 20 January 2019, Calori was appointed as the manager of Ternana. After less than one month, on 14 February, Calori was fired after he only managed to pick op two points in five league games.

Style of play
While not being particularly elegant or skilful defender, Calori was a powerful and physically strong centre back, who was known for his tenacity and his hard-tackling playing style, as well as his leadership.

References

1966 births
Living people
Sportspeople from Arezzo
Association football defenders
Italian footballers
Italian football managers
Pisa S.C. players
Udinese Calcio players
A.C. Perugia Calcio players
Brescia Calcio players
Venezia F.C. players
Serie A players
Serie B players
Serie C players
U.S. Triestina Calcio 1918 managers
U.S. Avellino 1912 managers
Calcio Padova managers
Brescia Calcio managers
Novara F.C. managers
Footballers from Tuscany